Below is a list of Palmyrene monarchs, the monarchs that ruled and presided over the city of Palmyra and the subsequent Palmyrene Empire in the 3rd century AD, and the later vassal princes of the Al Fadl dynasty which ruled over the city in the 14th century.

House of Odaenathus
Odaenathus, the lord of Palmyra, declared himself king before riding into battle against the Sassanians after news of the Roman defeat at Edessa reached him. This elevated Palmyra from a subordinate city to a de facto independent kingdom allied to Rome.

Odaenathus later elevated himself to the title of King of Kings, crowning his son co-King of Kings in 263. The title was later passed to Vaballathus his son, before it was dropped for the title of King and later Emperor.

Al Fadl dynasty

References

Palmyrene